Next Limit Technologies is a computer software company headquartered in Madrid, Spain. Founded in 1998 by engineers Victor Gonzalez and Ignacio Vargas the firm develops technologies in the field of digital simulation and visualization. In December 2016, the XFlow division was acquired by Dassault Systèmes.

Products
RealFlow — a dynamics and fluid simulator for film production. RealFlow has been used in the production of films such as: The Lord of the Rings: The Return of the King;
Maxwell Render — a physically correct light simulator and render engine;
XFlow — an engineering software for Computational fluid dynamics;
CaronteFX — an integrated physically-based animation editor extension tool for the Unity game engine.

Research and development
Next Limit has actively participated in various research projects throughout Europe as well as Spain. It is currently the leader of the European project, SAFECITI (Safe Citizen), which aims to create a simulation system for analysts that would predict the behavior of large crowds in urban environments in moments of panic, violence, or catastrophes. The system is based on serious game technology and is designed as a training platform. Other European projects that Next Limit has actively participated in are: PRISM, Skycoat and COELUX. COELUX is responsible for the production of a window with an optics system based on nanotechnology that can reproduce natural light and the appearance of solar and sky light. This technology is implemented in closed spaces that lack an exterior facing window.

In Spain, Next Limit has participated in biotechnology research to simulate the heart as a complex fluid structural system.

Awards

This was the second Technical Merit Oscar awarded to a Spanish person. The previous Oscar awarded to a Spanish person was Juan de la Cierva y Hoces in 1969 for his creation of the optic stabilizer Dynalens, an apparatus used to eliminate camera vibrations.

See also
 Computational fluid dynamics
 Particle system
 Computer simulation
 Lattice Boltzmann methods
 3D computer graphics
 Ray tracing

References

External links
 Official site

Computer physics engines
Virtual reality companies
Organisations based in Spain